Belín is a village and municipality in the Rimavská Sobota District of the Banská Bystrica Region of southern Slovakia. In the village is foodstuff store, public library and football pitch. Important sightseeing is late-classical church.

History
The village arose in the late 12th century. In historical records the village was first mentioned in 1349. In 1823 had been in the village 23 houses. Locals were engaged in agriculture and a hand made production of brooms and brushes.

See also
 List of municipalities and towns in Slovakia

References

Genealogical resources

The records for genealogical research are available at the state archive "Statny Archiv in Banska Bystrica, Slovakia"

 Roman Catholic church records (births/marriages/deaths): 1768-1878 (parish B)
 Reformated church records (births/marriages/deaths): 1780-1897 (parish B)

External links
 
 
https://web.archive.org/web/20070427022352/http://www.statistics.sk/mosmis/eng/run.html
http://www.e-obce.sk/obec/belin/belin.html
Surnames of living people in Belin

Villages and municipalities in Rimavská Sobota District
Hungarian communities in Slovakia